Fred Roethlisberger (born February 28, 1943) is an American gymnastics coach.  He competed in gymnastics at the 1968 Summer Olympics. Later, he became the gymnastics coach for Minnesota's "Golden Gophers" for 33 years.

References

1943 births
Living people
American gymnastics coaches
Olympic gymnasts of the United States
Gymnasts at the 1968 Summer Olympics
American male artistic gymnasts
Pan American Games medalists in gymnastics
Pan American Games gold medalists for the United States
Pan American Games silver medalists for the United States
Pan American Games bronze medalists for the United States
Gymnasts at the 1967 Pan American Games
Medalists at the 1967 Pan American Games